Ju Ping (born 25 January 1966) is a Chinese child program host. She won China's Golden Mike Award in 1993 and 1995.

Ju Ping is the first host from China to host youth programs.

Biography
Ju Ping was born in a highly educated family in Beijing in January 1966, with her ancestral home in Rongcheng, Weihai, Shandong. She  has an elder brother.

In 1966, the Cultural Revolution was launched by Mao Zedong, her parent was sent to the May Seventh Cadre Schools to work in Zhengyang County, Henan.

After the Cultural Revolution, her family returned to Beijing.

Ju Ping studied at Beijing National Day School for her elementary education. She graduated from Beijing Children Normal Training School in 1984. After graduation, she joined China Central Television where she hosted Jigsaw Puzzle between 1 June 1985 to 31 May 1995.

Ju Ping joined the Chinese Communist Party in November 1998.

In November 2002, she was appointed Vice-President of the China Association of Radio and Television.

Works

Television
 Jigsaw Puzzle

Film
 Secret Plans (2014)
 The King of Tibetan Antelope (2015)

Awards
 1993 Golden Mike Award
 1995 Golden Mike Award

Personal life
Ju Ping has a son with her former husband, Jiang Yiyao. Her son was born on 22 January 1993. Her current husband is Yang Shuo.

References

1966 births
People from Beijing
Living people
Chinese television presenters
CCTV television presenters
Chinese children's television presenters